The Coburger Convent der akademischen Landsmannschaften und Turnerschaften (abbreviation: CC) is an association of 100 German and Austrian Studentenverbindungen, all of which are based on the principle of tolerance. Its full name is Coburger Convent der Landsmannschaften and Turnerschaften an deutschen Hochschulen.

The Coburger Convent was founded in Coburg in 1951. 

It consists of 100 Landsmannschaften and Turnerschaften. The oldest member corporation was founded in  1716, the youngest in 1994.

The Coburger Convent’s colours are white-green-red-white.

Cartel

Triple Alliance 
Landsmannschaft Darmstadtia Gießen; Landsmannschaft Spandovia Berlin and Landsmannschaft Zaringia Heidelberg

Famous members of Coburger Convent 

Karl von Bardeleben (1849–1919), Anatomist
Peter Harry Carstensen (born 1947), Politician, since 2005 he has been Minister President of the state of Schleswig-Holstein, serving as President of the Bundesrat in 2005/06
Thomas Dehler (1897–1967), Politician, Federal Republic of Germany's first Minister of Justice (1949–1953) and chairman of Free Democratic Party (1954–1957)
Rolf Emmrich (1910–1974), Professor of internal medicine.
Adolph Albrecht Erlenmeyer (1822–1877), Physician and psychiatrist
Friedrich Albrecht Erlenmeyer (1849–1926), Physician and psychiatrist
Franz Etzel (1902–1970), Politician,  Minister of Finance.
Paul Flechsig (1847–1929), Neuroanatomist, psychiatrist and neuropathologist
Carl Friedrich Goerdeler (1884–1945), Politician
Levin Goldschmidt (1828–1897), Jurist
Otto Hahn (1879–1968), Chemist and Nobel laureate, a pioneer in the fields of radioactivity and radiochemistry
Hugo Junkers (1859–1935), Engineer
Friedrich August Kekulé von Stradonitz (1829–1896), Organic chemist
Friedrich August Körnicke (1828–1908),  Agronomist and botanist
Hermann Löns (1866–1914), Journalist and writer
Gottfried Münzenberg (born 1940), Physicist
Günther Oettinger (born 1953), Politician, Minister-President of the state of Baden-Württemberg between 2005 and 2010 
Ferdinand Sauerbruch (1875–1951), Surgeon
Ferdinand Schneider (1911–1984), Chemist
Wilhelm Solf (1862–1936), Scholar, diplomat, jurist and statesman
Heinrich Spoerl (1887–1955), Author
Theodor Thierfelder (1824–1904), Internist
Wilhelm Trübner (1851–1917), Painter
Rainer Wieland (born 1957), Politician and Member of the European Parliament
Max Wilms (1867–1918), Pathologist and surgeon
Alexander von Zagareli (1844–1929), Professor at St. Petersburg University and co-founder of Tbilisi State University

External links

 http://www.coburger-convent.de

Coburg
Student societies in Germany